A Little Bit of Fluff is a 1919 British silent comedy film directed by Kenelm Foss and Geoffrey H. Malins and starring Ernest Thesiger, Dorothy Minto and Bertie Wright. The film is an adaptation of the popular stage farce of the same name by Walter W. Ellis. Ernest Thesiger reprised his stage success as Bertram Tully, as did Alfred Drayton (Dr. Bigland) and Stanley Lathbury (Nixon Trippet). The play was filmed again in 1928. The 1919 version was made at the Kew Bridge Studios in London.

Cast
 Ernest Thesiger as Bertram Tully  
 Dorothy Minto as Mamie Scott  
 Bertie Wright as John Ayers  
 Kitty Barlow as Pamela Ayers  
 James Lindsay as Aunt Agnes  
 Alfred Drayton as Dr. Bigland  
 Stanley Lathbury as Nixon Tippett

Critical reception
Amongst contemporary reviews, The Derbyshire Advertiser noted "a riot of extraordinary and mirth-provoking scenes, and during its projection large audiences were continually laughing in the hearty manner that tells of real appreciation and enjoyment.  Ernest Thesiger, as Bertram Tully, was the outstanding character of the film, and his facial expressions were truly wonderful achievements”; while Cinema Chat wrote, "It’s a perfect scream from start to finish, and the acting in several of the ludicrous scenes is clever - that’s the very word for it.  We believe that this is Ernest Thesiger’s first appearance in the movies.”

References

Bibliography
 Low, Rachael. History of the British Film, 1918-1929. George Allen & Unwin, 1971.

External links

1919 films
1919 comedy films
British silent feature films
British comedy films
Films directed by Kenelm Foss
British films based on plays
Films set in England
Films shot at Kew Bridge Studios
British black-and-white films
1910s English-language films
1910s British films
Silent comedy films